Sestilio Mazuca or Sextilius Mazuca or Sestilio Massuca or Sextilius Massuca was a Roman Catholic prelate who served as Bishop of Alessano (1592–1594).

Biography
On 19 June 1592, Sestilio Mazuca was appointed during the papacy of Pope Clement VIII as Bishop of Alessano. He served as Bishop of Alessano until his resignation in 1594.

References

External links and additional sources
 (for Chronology of Bishops) 
 (for Chronology of Bishops) 

16th-century Italian Roman Catholic bishops
Bishops appointed by Pope Clement VIII